Astakos (meaning "lobster") is a town and a former municipality in Aetolia-Acarnania, West Greece, Greece. Since the 2011 local government reform it is part of the municipality Xiromero, of which it is a municipal unit. The municipal unit has an area of 345.099 km2. It is located on a bay on the eastern shore of the Ionian Sea, near the southern end of the Acarnanian Mountains. It takes its name from the ancient Acarnanian town Astacus ( - Astakos), and was named Dragamesti in the Middle Ages. It is speculated to be the site of ancient Dulichium.

It is 16 km southeast of Kalamos (island), 30 km southwest of Agrinio, 35 km northwest of Missolonghi and 55 km southeast of Preveza.

Subdivisions
The municipal unit Astakos is subdivided into the following communities (constituent villages in brackets):
Agrampela
Astakos (Astakos, Valti)
Bampini
Karaiskakis
Machairas
Chrysovitsa
Palaiomanina
Prodromos
Skourtou
Strongylovouni (Strongylovouni, Manina Vlizianon)
Vasilopoulo
Vliziana

Economy
The city has a port able to hold ferries. The countryside mainly produces wheat, corn and few grapes. Fishing is an important source of income.

Historical population

Noteworthy persons
Leo Leandros (b. 1926), singer and composer

In popular culture
Astakos is also the birthplace of the fictional characters Xeones and Diomache in Steven Pressfield's novel Gates of Fire. Cousins Xeones and Diomache both survive the sack of Astakos by Argos (cir. 500 BC); Xeones later becomes a perioikoi of Sparta and serves at the Battle of Thermopylae as a squire to the Spartiate Dienekes.

See also
List of settlements in Aetolia-Acarnania
List of cities in ancient Acarnania

External links
Municipality of Astakos

References

Populated places in Aetolia-Acarnania
Acarnania